Joël Bopesu (born 25 January 1995) is a Congolese professional footballer who currently plays for Vilniaus Žalgiris as a defender. He formerly played for Arles-Avignon, where he made one appearance in Ligue 2, coming on as a substitute for Téji Savanier in the 4–1 win against Orléans on 15 May 2015. Besides France, he has played in North Macedonia, Latvia, Ukraine and Lithuania.

Career
After one year with Épinal, one year with Calais, six months with FK Skopje and six months again with FK Rabotnički, he moved to Riga FC in February 2019.

Career statistics

References

External links

 

1995 births
Living people
Democratic Republic of the Congo emigrants to France
French footballers
Association football forwards
AC Arlésien players
SAS Épinal players
Calais RUFC players
FK Skopje players
FK Rabotnički players
Riga FC players
Ligue 2 players
FC Lviv players
Canet Roussillon FC players
Ukrainian Premier League players
Championnat National players
Championnat National 2 players
Championnat National 3 players
Latvian Higher League players
French expatriate footballers
Expatriate footballers in North Macedonia
French expatriate sportspeople in North Macedonia
Expatriate footballers in Latvia
French expatriate sportspeople in Latvia
Expatriate footballers in Ukraine
French expatriate sportspeople in Ukraine